Casper's Scare School is a series of three video games based on the computer animated film and TV series of the same name. The plot of the games involve Casper the Friendly Ghost who having been sent to "Scare School" by his three uncles, must thwart plots by the school bully Thatch the vampire's plan to turn all the characters to stone, stop Casper helping his classmates or stealing all the glory in the school sports day.

The first title, Casper's Scare School, is an adventure video game released for the PlayStation 2 in the PAL region. A Nintendo DS game entitled Casper's Scare School: Classroom Capers, was designed by Jon Hare and developed by Nikitova Games. Released on November 14, 2008 in the PAL region and on October 26, 2010 in North America. This version has simple gameplay and is targeted for young children, around 4 to 6 years old.

The third game: Casper's Scare School: Spooky Sports Day for the DS and Wii followed in 2009.

Casper's Scare School
This title for PlayStation 2 is a 3D racing game with six levels. In the first level is a race against time in which Casper's suitcase has bust open throwing its contents around his mansion so he has 400 seconds to find the 30 items before the school bus leaves to take him to Scare School. This layout of this level is reused from the Great Hall level in the 2007 game Casper and the Ghostly Trio being from the same developer. The second level is similar to Crazy Taxi in which the player has 120 seconds to navigate the boat to collect six classmates around Deedstown. The next three levels are a series of three-lap races between Casper, his friends Ra, Mantha, Mickey, and Monaco along with the school bully Thatch. The first race is around the school grounds, the second through the school corridors as well as the grounds and the third in the gym with polls to jump over. In the final level Thatch has turned Casper's four friends, from the previous races, into stone. Casper must find each friend turning them back into themselves and get to his mansion before Thatch does. The game also features a multiplayer mode in which any of the six racing characters can be played in the lap races.

Casper's Scare School: Classroom Capers
In this 2D game for Nintendo DS, Casper must complete three classes, science with Professor Thurdigree Burns, history with Hedy Hopper and gym with Frankengymteacher, per week for eight weeks earning four marks in each session, earning a C grade or higher, within the time limit. It is played with the DS being held sideways in a similar style to the Brain Age series, but with just the stylus. To get his marks Casper must get what he needs by trading with his classmates giving them things they want before returning to his desk or gym mat to complete the assignment. Casper must avoid the teacher who watches certain parts of the classroom at a time, the Gargoyles who patrol the classroom, Thatch who thinks Casper is being too friendly and Kibosh who oversees the classes in the final week. This is the only time Thatch is seen in his bat form in the games. If any enemies catch Casper out of a desk (Casper's own desk in the case of Kibosh) he will be sent back to his desk, any item he is holding will be confiscated and he has to start the task again. Casper can earn bonus marks by scaring Thatch with a beetle blast or the teacher with a Power Bolt. As Casper progresses through the game the classroom gets bigger with new classmates added as well as new enemies and new power-ups.

Casper's Scare School: Scary Sports Day

A single player 2D game developed by The Code Monkeys, published by Blast! Entertainment and released for the Nintendo DS and Wii in 2009. It is the annual Sports Day at Scare School and Casper and his friends have been training hard determined not to let Thatch steal all the glory for himself. The player gets to control Casper, Ra or Mantha, with more playable characters unlocked as they progress through the game. The player must win seven events: Creepy Uppies, Dragon Egg & Spoon Race, People Chase, Goal Creeper, Scare Boarding, Frog Lab, and Gymnasties. After winning the Scare School sports day the player gets to play in the "fleshy" versions of each event in Deedstown.

External links
 GameSpot Summary PS2
 GameSpot Summary Classroom Capers

2008 video games
Adventure games
PlayStation 2 games
Nintendo DS games
Casper the Friendly Ghost
Casper video games
School-themed video games
Video games based on television series
Video games developed in the United Kingdom